The Angel with the Trumpet is a 1950 British drama film directed by Anthony Bushell and starring Eileen Herlie, Basil Sydney, and Norman Wooland. It was based on a novel by Ernst Lothar. The film follows the rise and fall of an Austrian aristocrat, and her eventual death following the Anschluss. The film was a remake of a 1948 Austrian film Der Engel mit der Posaune.

Plot
Henrietta Stein, daughter of a Jewish academic, is the mistress of the Habsburg Crown Prince who cannot marry her. She chooses instead a loveless marriage with Francis Alt, the head of the Alt Viennese piano manufacturing firm. Only their mutual friend Baron Hugo Tran knows of their feelings. On the day of her marriage, the Prince kills himself in despair.

Francis and Henrietta raise their three children in the family home, uninterrupted until twelve years later, the Baron visits her in Vienna and they have an affair. Henrietta plans to leave her husband. The affair is interrupted when her brother-in-law is dying and her son finds her in the arms of the Baron. Returning home, she admits her affair to her husband who has returned unexpectedly. The next morning, her husband has a duel with the Baron and kills him.

Four years later, World War One breaks out. Her husband and sons enlist. Her husband is left paralyzed and can no longer speak. Her son Paul takes over as the head of the factory. Her daughter Monica leaves for America with her boyfriend Gino to escape the conditions in Vienna. Her son Herman speculated in illegal arms trading and loses $2000. Faced with jail, he asks her for the money but she  doesn't have it to give. She gives him her diamonds and throws him out of the house. The only good news comes when Paul announces his engagement. She gives all of the news to her husband, who gives her a note apologizing for marrying her and they reconcile.

Years later, Herman joins the Nazis as Nazi popularity rises in Austria. The Anschluss comes and the Nazis come to arrest her for not flying the Nazi flag on her house. Before they take her away, she jumps out of a third-storey window to her death. Herman arrives minutes later, to tell her he had arranged for her Jewish ancestry to be erased for her own safety, but she is already dead.

World War Two comes. The Alt family home is destroyed by bombing. The Alt piano factory is in ruins but Paul, his wife, their children and one remaining worker, re-establish the factory with their first new piano.

Partial cast

Production
To reduce costs, this British film re-used much of the earlier Austrian film, especially for distance shots and for scenes with minor characters who were dubbed. In this way, Maria Schell and Oskar Werner launched their international careers in this film.

It was the first film Bushell directed.

References

External links

1950 films
Films directed by Anthony Bushell
1950 drama films
British drama films
Films based on Austrian novels
Films set in Vienna
Films set in the 1880s
Films set in the 1890s
Films set in the 1900s
Films set in the 1910s
Films set in the 1920s
Films set in the 1930s
Remakes of Austrian films
British black-and-white films
1950s English-language films
1950s British films